3 Non-Blondes is a British hidden camera comedy show (and the group name given to the three comedians who star in it), distributed by the British Broadcasting Corporation on the BBC Three digital network channel, first aired in 2003.  It also airs on BBC America and Comedy Channel in Australia.

Ninia Benjamin, Tameka Empson and Jocelyn Jee Esien play a range of comical characters to the unsuspecting public, varying from a fictional celebrity named Marcia Brown to a charity worker who only wants a kiss or a hug instead of a cash donation.

Two series of the comedy have been broadcast. Both were released as a DVD box set on 22 November 2004, distributed by Paramount Home Entertainment. In an interview concerning her own sketch show, Little Miss Jocelyn, Jocelyn hinted a third series would probably not be filmed, as the cast had become too well known. The public would either identify them or play along with the sketches, much to the stars' embarrassment.

In 2003, they were listed in The Observer as one of the 50 funniest British comedy acts.

In 2007, Trouble TV picked up the series and showed it on Mondays at 9 pm until the channel got axed.

In 2010, Jocelyn Jee Esien starred in her own spin-off to the show called One Non-Blonde: Down Under, which began to air on 21 September. In it she takes three of her characters on a tour of New Zealand.

Cast
Ninia Benjamin – Herself
Tameka Empson – Herself
Jocelyn Jee Esien – Herself
Gary Reich – Producer
Michael Cumming – Director (Season 1)
John F.D. Northover – Director (Season 2)
Jane Wong – Hidden camera operator
Lisa Thomson – Hidden camera operator
Kate York – Hidden camera operator
Frances Callier – Hidden camera operator
Kyra Groves – Hidden camera operator
Angela V. Shelton – Hidden camera operator
Huw Jenkins – Film editor
Paul Machliss – Film editor

References

External links
 
 "3 NoN Blondes || Best Of || 01 || HQ", YouTube.

BBC television comedy
2003 British television series debuts
2003 British television series endings
2000s British comedy television series
Black British television shows
English-language television shows
Television shows set in London